His Coquettish Wife (German: Seine kokette Frau) is a 1916 German silent film directed by Hubert Moest and starring Hedda Vernon, Erich Kaiser-Titz and Reinhold Schünzel.

Cast
 Hedda Vernon
 Erich Kaiser-Titz
 Reinhold Schünzel
 Stefanie Hantzsch

References

Bibliography
 Bock, Hans-Michael & Bergfelder, Tim. The Concise CineGraph. Encyclopedia of German Cinema. Berghahn Books, 2009.

External links

1916 films
Films of the German Empire
German silent feature films
Films directed by Hubert Moest
German black-and-white films
1910s German films
Films shot at Terra Studios